Savaale Samali is a 1971 Indian Tamil-language film, starring Sivaji Ganesan in is his 150th film. The film was remade in Telugu as Manchi Rojulu Vachchaayi (1972), in Malayalam as Randu Lokam (1977), in Kannada as Siritanakke Savaal (1978) and in Hindi as Charnon Ki Saugandh (1988). The film become a blockbuster at the box-office, running for over 100 days in theaters.

Plot

Cast 
 Sivaji Ganesan as Manickam
 Jayalalithaa as Sakunthala
 R. Muthuraman as Kalimuthu
 C. R. Vijayakumari as Kaveri
 M. N. Nambiar as Rajavel
 V. S. Raghavan as Ayyakannu
 T. K. Bhagavathi as Thirunavukarasu (Periya Pannai)
 S. Varalakshmi as Alamelu
 Ganthimathi as Manickam Mother
 Nagesh as Chinna Pannai Singaram
 Kanakadurga as Sakunthala's friend
 Samikannu as Villager
 A. Veerappan as Nattamai
 Usilai Mani as Villager
 P. S. Venkatachalam Pillai as Villager
 Comedy Shanmugam as Villager

Soundtrack 
The music was composed by M. S. Viswanathan, while the lyrics were written by Kannadasan and Malliyam Rajagopal. P. Susheela won her second National Award for the song "Chitukuruvikenna".

References

Bibliography

External links 

1970s Tamil-language films
1971 films
Films scored by M. S. Viswanathan
Tamil films remade in other languages